Asparagusate reductase is an enzyme that catalyzes the chemical reaction

3-mercapto-2-mercaptomethylpropanoate + NAD+  asparagusate + NADH + H+

Thus, the two substrates of this enzyme are 3-mercapto-2-mercaptomethylpropanoate and nicotinamide adenine dinucleotide ion, whereas its 3 products are asparagusate, nicotinamide adenine dinucleotide, and hydrogen ion.

This enzyme belongs to the family of oxidoreductases, specifically those acting on a sulfur group of donors with NAD+ or NADP+ as acceptor.  The systematic name of this enzyme class is 3-mercapto-2-mercaptomethylpropanoate:NAD+ oxidoreductase. Other names in common use include asparagusate dehydrogenase, asparagusic dehydrogenase, asparagusate reductase (NADH2), and NADH2:asparagusate oxidoreductase.

References

 
 

EC 1.8.1
NADH-dependent enzymes
Enzymes of unknown structure